Count Magnus Fredrik Ferdinand Björnstjerna, (10 October 1779 – 6 October 1847), was a Swedish count and military general, son of the envoy to Sachsen Magnus Olof Björnstjerna and his wife, countess Vilhelmina von Hagen. He was the grandson of archbishop Magnus Beronius.

Biography
At the age of 14, Björnstjerna was sent to Sweden, and attained the same year the rank of ensign (Swedish: fänrik) upon enrolling in The King's Guard. During the Finnish War he was the head adjutant at the Finnish Army's general staff, and participated in the major military campaigns during the war. The same year he was appointed major in the Västmanland Regiment. He was one of the most prominent participants in the Swedish revolution of 1809; when it ended he was sent on a secret mission to Napoleon I.

In 1812 he was appointed general of Kalmar Regiment, and participated in the war in Germany, notably the attack on Dessau, the Battle of Fredrikort and other parts of the military campaigns. In 1814 he became major general and participated in warfare on the opposite side of the Rhine. In the same year he became the head of Field marshal Curt von Stedingk's staff, and was appointed to adjutant general of foreign affairs at the army in Norway, where he led  the negotiations that led to the Convention of Moss of 1814.

In 1815 he was appointed adjutant general for the Swedish Army and in 1820 to lieutenant general. Björnstjerna was from 1828 to 1846 the Swedish Minister Resident in London. In 1815 he was created Baron stånd, count in 1826, he was appointed the Royal Order of the Seraphim in 1838 and in 1841 the Lord of the Realm. In 1843 he was appointed marshal.

References

1779 births
1847 deaths
Swedish Army generals
Swedish counts
Military personnel from Dresden
Swedish military commanders of the Napoleonic Wars
Ambassadors of Sweden to the United Kingdom
Members of the Royal Swedish Academy of War Sciences
Commanders Grand Cross of the Order of the Sword